The Law and Society Association (LSA), founded in 1964, is a group of scholars from many fields and countries who share a common interest in the place of law in social, political, economic and cultural life.  It is one of the leading professional associations for those interested in the sociology of law.

Members bring expertise in law, sociology, political science, psychology, anthropology, economics, history, and geography as well as in other related areas to the study of sociolegal phenomena.

Among its activities, the Association publishes the Law & Society Review, sponsors annual conferences and educational workshops, and fosters the development of academic programs in law and society around the world.

The LSA's executive office is located in the University of Massachusetts, Amherst.

Annual meetings

 2007: Berlin, Germany (July 25–28)
 2008: Montreal, Quebec (May 29-June 1)
 2009: Denver, Colorado (May 28–31)
 2010: Chicago, Illinois (May 27–30)
 2011: San Francisco, California (June 2–5)
 2012: Honolulu, Hawaii (June 5–8)
 2013: Boston, Massachusetts (May 30-June 2)
 2014: Minneapolis, Minnesota (May 29 - June 1)
 2015: Seattle, Washington (May 28–31)
 2016: New Orleans, Louisiana (June 2–5)
 2017: Mexico City, Mexico (June 20–23) 
 2018: Toronto, Canada (June 7–10)
 2019: Washington, DC (May 30 - June 2)

Law and Society Association International Prize 
This prize is offered to a scholar (typically residing outside of the U.S.) who made significant contributions to the advancement of knowledge in the field of law and society. Past recipients of the award include:

 2001: Neelan Tiruchelvam (posthumously)
 2003: Masaji Chiba
 2005: Hazel Genn
 2007: Xingliang Chen
 2007: Dario Melossi
 2009: Yves Dezelay
 2012: Upendra Baxi
 2013: David Nelken
 2014: Setsuo Miyazawa
 2015: Ronen Shamir
 2016: Susanne Karstedt
 2017: Nachman Ben-Yehuda
 2017: John Braithwaite
 2018: Fiona Haines
 2019: Kelly Hannah-Moffat
 2020: Ulrike Schultz
 2021: Rachel Sieder
 2022: Nicola Lacey

References

External links
 Official Website

Organizations established in 1964
Legal organizations based in the United States
Law-related professional associations
Law-related learned societies
University of Utah